Jessica Rabbit is a fictional character from the Roger Rabbit film-and-novel franchise.

Jessica Rabbit may also refer to:

 Jessica Rabbit (album), a 2016 album by Sleigh Bells
 Rabbit vibrator also known as Jessica Rabbit vibrator, a sex toy
 Melyssa Ford (born 1976), Canadian model, often referred to as Jessica Rabbit

See also
 Jessica (given name)
 Rabbit